Aver may refer to:

People
 , Russian botanist

Places
 Aver lake or Aver See, Germany

Organisations
 AVER (band)
 AVer Information, Taiwanese company
 American Veterans for Equal Rights

See also
Vow